The Loaita Bank is one of the significant maritime features in the Spratly Islands.

The bank contains a number of maritime features, including shoals, reefs, an island, two sand cays, and a lagoon:
Loaita Island
Lankiam Cay
Loaita Nan (Loaita Southwest Reef)
Loaita Cay
()
and numerous less well defined/named shoals and reefs.

At the NE end of the bank there is "a ridge of foul ground that is an extension" of the bank; Menzies Reef lies at the NE end of this ridge, inside Dangerous Ground.

It is neighboured by the Thitu Reefs and Subi Reef to the NW, Irving Reef to the east, North Danger Reef to the north, and the Tizard and Union Banks to the south.

References

Banks of the Spratly Islands